Flis (Raftsman) is a Polish-language opera in one act by Stanisław Moniuszko to a libretto by Stanisław Bogusławski. It was premiered in Warsaw on 24 September 1858.

Cast
Antoni, a wealthy landowner – bass
Zosia, his daughter – soprano
Franek, young rafter – tenor
Jakub, hairdresser – baritone
Sixth, former soldier – bass
Feliks, rafter – tenor
Rafters, villagers, villagers, children.

Performances
The opera was given in a concert performance and recorded in the Wielki Theatre of Polish National Opera at the 2019  Chopin and his Europe International Music Festival, marking the 200th anniversary of Moniuszko's birth.

Recordings
Flis – Bernard Ładysz (bass), Andrzej Hiolski (baritone), Zdzisław Nikodem (tenor), Bogdan Paprocki (tenor), Halina Słonicka (soprano), Antoni Majak (bass) Chór Filharmonii Narodowej, Orkiestra Filharmonii Narodowej,  1962 Anaklasis 58 minutes
Flis – Ewa Tracz (Zosia), Matheus Pompeu (Franek), Mariusz Godlewski (Jakub), Aleksander Teliga (Antoni), Wojtek Gierlach (Szóstak), Paweł Cichoński (Feliks), Podlaska Opera and Orchestra, Europa Galante, Fabio Biondi 3 April 2020 NIFCCD086

References

1858 operas
Operas by Stanisław Moniuszko
Polish-language operas
One-act operas
Operas